Ciutadella is a common place name in Catalan-speaking areas.

Ciutadella de Menorca 
 Ciutadella de Menorca, a municipality on Menorca
 Ciutadella de Menorca Cathedral
 Ciutadella Lighthouse
 Atlètic de Ciutadella, the city's football club
 CV Ciutadella, the city's volleyball club

In Catalonia

Barcelona 

 Parc de la Ciutadella, a park in Barcelona
 Ciutadella – Vila Olímpica (Barcelona Metro)

Girona 

 Ciutadella de Roses